International Federation of Free Evangelical Churches (IFFEC) is a worldwide federation of  evangelical free churches that trace their roots to the Radical Pietist movement (which split off/diverged from Pietistic Lutheranism). The member federations predominantly originate from Europe and the Americas.

History
The history of the Federation has roots in a 19th century European pietist movement.  IFFEC was founded in Bern, Switzerland, in 1948 by unions of free evangelical churches from various countries.

Statistics
According to a census of the denomination, in 2022, it had 700,000 members in 33 countries.

The two largest member federations are the Evangelical Covenant Church and the Evangelical Free Church of America in the United States. The two largest European federations are in Sweden and Germany. The two largest federations in Asia are both in India, Evangelical Free Church of India,  Hindustani Covenant Church.

Beliefs
The Federation has a confession of faith based on the beliefs of the Believers' Church.

References

External links
 

Non-denominational Evangelical unions
Radical Pietism